Chief Sequoyah is a giant sequoia located within the Giant Forest of Sequoia National Park in California. It is the 9th largest tree in Giant Forest grove, the 27th largest giant sequoia in the world, and could be considered the 26th largest depending on how badly Ishi Giant atrophied during the Rough Fire in 2015.

History
In 1928, Sequoia National Park superintendent Colonel John R. White named the tree to honor Sequoyah, a polymath of the Cherokee Nation who created the Cherokee syllabary in 1821.

Description
Chief Sequoyah is located  uphill from the much larger President tree. The tree features an enormous burl on its southern face and is deeply fire scarred on its western face.

Dimensions

See also
List of largest giant sequoias
List of individual trees

References

Individual giant sequoia trees
Sequoia National Park